Rockport station is an MBTA Commuter Rail station in Rockport, Massachusetts. It is the terminus of the Rockport branch of the Newburyport/Rockport Line. The station complex consists of a single side platform with one revenue track plus 4 layover tracks for parked trains and a short stretch of auxiliary track.

Like many MBTA Commuter Rail stations, Rockport's platform is mostly low with a single high section in the center. Other stations have the high section on the outer end of the platform, but this was not possible due to a commercial property abutting the outer end of the station.

The MBTA is currently planning upgrades to the Rockport station area, including a bus shelter and information kiosk as well as improvements to the layover yard. Further improvements, including a full-length high-level platform, were recently planned but shelved due to funding issues.

History

Eastern Railroad and B&M
Rockport was opened as the terminus of the Rockport Railroad (an independent extension of the Eastern Railroad's Gloucester Branch) in November 1861. The only loop on the entire Boston & Maine system was built at Rockport in the early 1900s, just west of the station around what is now Loop Pond. Although most trains did not need to be turned, private and parlor cars run in the summer months needed to be reversed before the return trip.
Double-ended Budd RDC railcars took over service in 1955, though the loop was in regular use until 1962. The loop tracks were removed in 1965. An unpaved trail, connected to Tarrs Lane and Applecart Road, now follows the path of the loop.
Initially, Rockport trains were operated by the Eastern Railroad and met Eastern mainline trains at Beverly. In 1864, trains began to be through-routed to Boston to increase frequencies on the inner part of the trunk line. The Eastern bought the branch in 1868; by the 1870s, regular commuter service was available. The Eastern was leased by the Boston and Maine Railroad in 1885 and merged into it in 1890. Rockport service continued in the same fashion for decades, with 13 inbound round trips in 1906, 14 trips in 1950, and 11 trips in 1962.

The former station building is no longer extant, having been torn down around the 1950s. However, the original freight house, built between 1861 and 1884, is still in place east of the layover yard. It has long been used for storage by an animal feeds dealer, but may be rehabilitated for MBTA office and storage use.

MBTA era
Rockport has seen almost continuous service for over 150 years, with just two gaps. When the newly formed MBTA began funding commuter rail service in 1965, communities outside the funding district were left to pay for trains to continue stopping. Rockport and neighboring Gloucester initially declined to subsidize service. Service past Manchester was discontinued on January 28, 1965, along with the outer sections of the Fitchburg Line and Central Mass Branch. service was to resume on June 6. After a lawsuit in which the Eastern Massachusetts Street Railway challenged the right of the MBTA to provide out-of-district service, Rockport service resumed on June 28, 1965. The MBTA bought most B&M commuter assets, including the Gloucester Branch, on December 27, 1976. The old yard at Rockport was upgraded to serve newer equipment in 1979.

On November 16, 1984, the Beverly Draw bridge connecting Salem to Beverly burned, cutting the Rockport Branch and the Ipswich Line from the rest of the system. (All lines running north and west of Newburyport were abandoned by 1984, leaving no route to move equipment to the rest of the northside.) A shuttle train was run from Rockport to Beverly Depot until January 7, 1985, when it was replaced by bus service. The locomotives used were then trucked to Danvers so they could be repaired at the MBTA's main maintenance facility. A new bridge opened on December 1, 1985, reconnecting Rockport to the larger system.

Modern improvements

The station has a number of issues, many of which are unique to Rockport. The layover facility is located in a residential and commercial area, rather than a rural or industrial lot as with most other MBTA layovers. Power available at the layover is insufficient to run locomotives, so they are forced to idle their diesel motors for long periods, causing noise pollution for surrounding properties. Due to inadequate parking facilities, commuters and patrons of nearby businesses often park inside the layover yard. Flooding after rain due to inadequate drainage further reduces available parking. Pooles Lane, a minor local road, cuts through the facility at an unprotected crossing, which limits the length of trains that can be stored, interferes with operations, and creates frequently unsafe conditions.

In 1999, the MBTA set a number of goals for improving Rockport station, which was largely unmodified since 1979. These included:
Double parking capacity to 175 spaces, with associated pavement, drainage, lighting, safety, and aesthetic improvements
Building a fully accessible platform long enough for 9-car trains
Providing layover space for four 9-car trains, with the ability to handle trains with two locomotives
However, due to the construction of the Greenbush Line and four infill stations on the Framingham/Worcester Line, funds were not immediately available to implement these goals. In 2006, as an interim solution, the MBTA built a mini-high platform to render the station handicapped accessible. The $70,000 platform took ten weeks to construct and opened on June 28, 2006.

In 2007, the MBTA completed an alternatives analysis of the layover facility. Several alternatives involved improvements to the existing site, while others looked at moving to a completely new yard at Piggery Crossing on Eastern Avenue (near the old Bass Rocks station site). All would have closed the Pooles Lane crossing and created a new street entrance and larger parking lot in the existing layover yard space. The Piggery Crossing layover alternatives minimized land-taking at the station area, but were more expensive and impacted a designated town historic space. In 2008, the MBTA began planning to implement Alternative A1, which would have created a modernized 4-track layover facility at the station with an engine shed to minimize noise from locomotives. The project was to be completed in 2011. The agency awarded a $1.2 million design contract in June 2008. However, after several years of delays, the improvements were tacitly canceled by the MBTA due to disagreements between the town and the MBTA over the project scope and funding.

In June 2013, the MBTA released plans for a less ambitious improvements project. Ground power for locomotives is to be upgraded from 175 and 200 amps to 600 amps to eliminate long-term idling, while a bus shelter and information kiosk are to be installed for use by the Cape Ann Transportation Authority. The then-$2.8 million project was to be partially funded by $1.2 million in federal earmarks obtained during the previous project planning phase, without need for local monies. The MBTA originally planned to advertise for bids by the end of 2013 and complete the project in late 2014.

However, design completion was delayed to January 2014 due to the need to place a substation inside, rather than guarded by a fence, and then to October 2014 by other matters. The schedule  called for full funding by July 2015, advertisement for construction in Q4 2015, and completion by 3Q 2016; however, this schedule was not achieved. Although the current project does not include an engine shed, new platform, or parking lot improvements, it is specifically designed not to preclude them and the MBTA may add those elements later if funding becomes available. Bidding for the $4.2 million project is expected to begin in October 2016.

On April 29, 2020, service between West Gloucester and Rockport was indefinitely replaced by buses due to a failure of the old bridge. That June, the MBTA indicated the closure would continue until the completion of the bridge replacement. Regular service to Rockport over the bridge resumed on May 23, 2022.

Bus connections
Rockport is served by Cape Ann Transportation Authority local bus service. Two routes run directly to the station:
Blue Line Gloucester - Rockport via Lanesville
Green Line Rockport Loop
Two additional routes run to Rockport via southern routings; they do not stop at the station but run via Broadway and Main Street about one quarter mile east of the station:
Red Line Gloucester - Rockport via Thatcher Road
Green Line Gloucester - Rockport via Eastern Avenue

References

External links

MBTA - Rockport
Rockport Station Improvements Project
2007 Alternatives Analysis

MBTA Commuter Rail stations in Essex County, Massachusetts
Stations along Boston and Maine Railroad lines